Video Italia was an Italian television channel owned by Gruppo Radio Italia. With Radio Italia Solo Musica Italiana, it telecasted Italian music videos and concerts on SKY Italia channel 712. On 31 December 2012, it was closed and merged with Radio Italia TV.

See also
 Radio Italia TV
 Video Italia (Canada)

External links
 Official Site

Music television channels
Television channels in Italy
Italian-language television stations
Television channels and stations established in 1998
Music organisations based in Italy